Raimundas Mažuolis (born 9 March 1972 in Vilnius) is a former freestyle swimmer from Lithuania.

He competed in the 100 metre freestyle at the 1992 Summer Olympic Games in Barcelona, finishing second in the B final in a time of 50.13 seconds. Mažuolis also competed at the 1988 Summer Olympics and at the 1996 Summer Olympics in Atlanta, Georgia, where he carried the flag for his newly independent nation at the opening ceremony.

References
sports-reference

1972 births
Living people
Lithuanian male freestyle swimmers
Swimmers at the 1988 Summer Olympics
Swimmers at the 1992 Summer Olympics
Swimmers at the 1996 Summer Olympics
Olympic swimmers of the Soviet Union
Olympic swimmers of Lithuania
Sportspeople from Vilnius
Lithuanian Sportsperson of the Year winners
World Aquatics Championships medalists in swimming
European Aquatics Championships medalists in swimming
Medalists at the 1988 Summer Olympics
Olympic silver medalists for the Soviet Union
Soviet male swimmers